The Orion-Ikarus 286, commonly known as the Orion III, was an articulated bus marketed to Canadian transit operators by Ontario Bus Industries (OBI). It was produced as a joint venture between Ikarus Body and Coach Works and OBI from 1985 to 1989, and deployed primarily in Ottawa (for OC Transpo) and Toronto (for the TTC). The Orion III fleets were retired prematurely due to corrosion, and all examples were withdrawn from service by 2003.

Production and design
Rolling Ikarus 280 shells (frame and body) were built by Ikarus in Hungary, with modifications to conform with standard Canadian transit bus dimensions, and then shipped to OBI's plant in Mississauga, Ontario via Montreal, where final assembly (including the installation of a domestic powertrain, doors, windows and seats) was performed. The Orion III was built from 1985 to 1989. Local assembly also was used for the similar Crown-Ikarus 286 for the United States, finished and sold by Crown Coach Corporation in Los Angeles for the United States transit market.

The bus used a "puller" design, with the engine driving the middle axle. All three axles were built by Rockwell International; the non-powered front and rear axles were Model FL-941, and the powered middle axle was Model 59742W, equipped with a standard 4.56:1 drive ratio.

One demonstrator vehicle was assembled in 1984. It was later leased by Transit Windsor in June 1985 for service through the Detroit–Windsor Tunnel, then was sold to St. Catharines Transit in 1988. Eventually, the 1984 demo model was sold to OC Transpo (serving Ottawa, Ontario) for parts.

Deployment
The first production contract was awarded to OBI by OC Transpo in November 1984. This was followed by an order from Toronto Transit Commission (TTC) for 90 buses in October 1986; the cost of the TTC contract was  million. As delivered for TTC, the Orion III had 61 seats and had a crush capacity of 107 riders. The first nine Orion III buses for TTC were delivered in 1987 for acceptance testing, with revenue service anticipated to start in early 1988.

In service, the Orion III prematurely developed corrosion, and were retired starting in 1995. By 2003, both OC Transpo and TTC had completely retired their Orion III fleets.

Operators
Four transit agencies used the Orion III, but only 3 had them on full roster:

 OC Transpo of Ottawa, Ontario operated 189 buses from 1985 to 2003; the agency also acquired 25 ex-TTC Orion III buses in the late 1990s as well as the ex-Demo from St. Catherines (for parts)
 Toronto Transit Commission of Toronto, Ontario operated 90 buses from late 1987 to 2003 (retirement began in 1997-1998); some sold to OC Transpo
 St. Catharines Transit operated the ex-Demo (1984) Orion III from 1988 to the early 1990s.

Competitors
 GM New Look articulated (TA60-102N)
 New Flyer D60(HF)

References

External links

 CPTDB wiki
 
 
 

Articulated buses
Joint ventures
Ikarus buses
Step-entrance buses
Buses of Canada
Vehicles introduced in 1984